List of Guggenheim Fellowships awarded in 1932. Fifty-seven scholars and artists received awards.

1932 U.S. and Canadian Fellows

1932 Latin American and Caribbean Fellows

See also
 Guggenheim Fellowship
 List of Guggenheim Fellowships awarded in 1931
 List of Guggenheim Fellowships awarded in 1933

References

1932
1932 awards